Shallum ("retribution") was the name of several people of the Old Testament.

Shallum of Israel
King of Israel.

Alternative name of Jehoahaz
King of Judah

Son of Tikvah
Keeper of the temple-wardrobe in the reign of Josiah (2 Kings 22:14) and husband of Huldah the Prophetess.

One of the posterity of Judah
(1 Chronicles 2:40, 41).

A descendant of Simeon
(1 Chr. 4:25).

A descendant of Levi
One of the line of the high priests (1 Chr. 6:13).

One of the sons of Naphtali
(1 Chr. 7:13).

A gatekeeper who lived in Jerusalem
(1 Chr. 9:17)

A Levite porter
(1 Chr. 9:19, 31; Jeremiah 35:4).

The uncle of the prophet Jeremiah
(Jer. 32:7).

Son of Hallohesh
Ruler of a half-district of Jerusalem, repaired a section of the wall of Jerusalem with the help of his daughters (Nehemiah 3:12).

References

Set index articles on Hebrew Bible people
Tribe of Simeon